Dame Henrietta Louise Moore,  (born 18 May 1957) is a British social anthropologist. She is the director of the Institute for Global Prosperity at University College, London (UCL), part of the Bartlett, UCL's Faculty of the Built Environment.

Early life

Moore graduated from Durham University with an upper second in Archaeology and Anthropology in 1979. She continued her studies at Newnham College, Cambridge, completing a PhD in 1983.

Career

After leaving university Moore spent one year working for the United Nations in Burkina Faso as a Field Director. She then became a Curatorial Assistant at the Museum of Archaeology and Anthropology, University of Cambridge before joining the University of Kent as a Lecturer in Social Anthropology in 1985. Moore eventually rejoined Cambridge as a lecturer, where she became Director of Studies in Anthropology at Girton College and then a Fellow of Pembroke College in 1989.

After a series of academic appointments in Social Anthropology at the London School of Economics Moore took up the William Wyse Chair of Social Anthropology at Cambridge University. In 2009 Moore was made a Professorial Fellow of Jesus College, Cambridge.

Moore has been critical of proposed restrictions in immigration, as proposed by Leave.EU in the run-up to the 2016 United Kingdom European Union membership referendum. She is the Chair and Co-Founder of SHM Group, a consulting firm specialising in change management.

Honours
She was appointed Dame Commander of the Order of the British Empire (DBE) in the 2016 New Year Honours for services to the social sciences.

She was elected a Fellow of the British Academy in 2007. In 1995, Moore and Megan Vaughan were awarded the Herskovits Prize by the African Studies Association for their book Cutting Down Trees: Gender, Nutrition, and Agricultural Change in the Northern Province of Zambia, 1890-1990.

In 2014 Moore received an honorary degree from Queen's University Belfast.

Major works
 
 
 
  (Winner of the 1995 Herskovitz Prize)

References

External links
 Henrietta Moore official website 
 
 SHM Foundation website
 Barbican Centre Trust website
 European Research Council website

1957 births
Living people
Social anthropologists
British anthropologists
Alumni of Trevelyan College, Durham
Alumni of Newnham College, Cambridge
Fellows of Jesus College, Cambridge
Fellows of the British Academy
British women anthropologists
William Wyse Professors of Social Anthropology
British women scientists
Academics of the London School of Economics
Place of birth missing (living people)
Academics of University College London
Fellows of the Academy of Social Sciences
Dames Commander of the Order of the British Empire